Launch Complex 4 (LC-4) was one of the first series of launch complexes to be built at Cape Canaveral Space Force Station on Cape Canaveral, Florida. It consisted of two pads, LC-4 which was used for 25 launches of Bomarc, Matador and Redstone missiles between 1952 and 1960; and LC-4A, which was used for three Bomarc launches between 1958 and 1959.

Following its deactivation in 1960, the original structures at the complex were dismantled. New facilities were built at the site in the 1980s, and it was used for aerostat launches between 1983 and 1989. Following this, the aerostat launch facilities were also removed, and the complex is currently not accessible to the public.

Launches

References 
"Cape Canaveral virtual tour"

See also 

Cape Canaveral

Cape Canaveral Space Force Station
1950s establishments in Florida